Sterlin Thompson (born June 26, 2001) is an American baseball outfielder in the Colorado Rockies organization.

Early life and amateur career
Thompson grew up in Ocala, Florida and initially attended Forest High School. He transferred to North Marion High School prior to his senior year and batted .357 with 70 hits, 58 runs scored, and 35 RBIs. Thompson was rated the ninth-best shortstop in his class nationally by Perfect Game and initially committed to play at Stetson. He later decommitted and signed to play at Florida over offers from Mississippi State, LSU, and Kentucky. Thompson played summer collegiate baseball after graduating high school for the Orlando Scorpions of the Florida Collegiate Summer League (FCSL).

Thompson was moved to the outfield and became a starter during his freshman season. He was named to the Southeastern Conference (SEC) All-Freshman team after batting .301 with five home runs, three triples, 10 doubles, 39 runs scored, and 27 RBIs. After the season Thompson returned to the FCSL and played for the Winter Park Diamond Dawgs, where he batted .391 and was named a league All-Star.

Professional career
The Colorado Rockies selected Thompson in the 1st compensatory round, 31st overall, of the 2022 Major League Baseball draft. He signed with the team on July 29, 2022, and received a $2,430,500 signing bonus.

References

External links

Florida Gators bio

Florida Gators baseball players
Baseball players from Florida
Baseball outfielders
2001 births
Living people
Arizona Complex League Rockies players